Joe "Mr Piano" Henderson (2 May 1920 – 4 May 1980) was a British pianist born in Glasgow, Scotland, who was most active during the 1950s.

Early life and career
Henderson was taught to play the piano by his mother and became a professional at age 15, playing in dance bands. After World War II, he began working for the Peter Maurice publishing company. It was there that he met the singer Petula Clark in 1947. In 1949, Henderson introduced Clark to Alan A. Freeman, who, together with her father Leslie, formed the Polygon record label, for which she recorded her earliest hits.

Clark and Henderson later had a romantic relationship, which is said to have broken up because he did not want to be "Mr. Petula Clark". In 1957, George Hamilton IV scored a hit with Henderson and Jack Fishman's composition "Why Don't They Understand", a song they wrote about Henderson's relationship with Clark. Henderson later penned "There's Nothing More To Say" about their split.  Clark recorded both songs as album tracks.

In 1955, Clark suggested Henderson be allowed to record his own music, and he enjoyed two chart hits on Polygon, "Sing It With Joe" and "Sing It Again With Joe", both medleys of popular songs.

Henderson's biggest hit was "Trudie", which made number 14 in the UK Singles Chart, and number 1 in the sheet music chart, where it was the biggest hit of 1958. The song also won an Ivor Novello Award.

He continued to work through the 1960s and 1970s, at one time presenting a weekday afternoon show on BBC Radio 2 until his death.

In 1994, a previously unreleased 14-minute medley of Clark singing while accompanied by Henderson, recorded circa 1958, was found in the Pye Records vaults and released on her compilation CD, The Nixa Years: Volume 2.

Personal life and death
He died of a heart attack on 4 May 1980, two days after his 60th birthday.

UK Singles Chart discography
"Sing It With Joe" (June 1955) — Polygon P 1167 — UK #14
"Sing It Again With Joe" (September 1955) — Polygon P 1184 — UK #18
"Trudie" (July 1958) — Pye Nixa N 15147 — UK #14
"Treble Chance" (October 1959) — Pye 7N 15224 — UK #28
"Ooh! La! La!" (March 1960) — Pye 7N 15257 — UK #44

References

1920 births
1980 deaths
Ivor Novello Award winners
Musicians from Glasgow
Scottish jazz pianists
20th-century British pianists
20th-century Scottish musicians